Arkansaw is an unincorporated census-designated place in the eastern portion of the town of Waterville, in Pepin County, Wisconsin, United States. As of the 2010 census, its population was 177. From 1881 to 1886, the community was the county seat of Pepin County.

History
Arkansaw was founded in the early 1850s at a crossing of Arkansaw Creek, a tributary of the Eau Galle River. Initially built around lumbering, the first sawmill was opened in the community in 1852.

The community was originally built near the center of three dams within a mile of each other on Arkansaw Creek. All three were wiped out in a flood in 1907. Arkansaw Creek was named in honor of the Arkansas River.  Today, the course of the creek runs through Arkansaw Creek Park.

Geography

Demographics

Religion
The community is home to three churches: Catholic, Methodist and Community of Christ.

Notable people
Lucius Roy Holbrook - U.S. Army Major General
Willard Ames Holbrook - U.S. Army Major General
Mary Laschinger - businesswoman
Samuel L. Plummer - Wisconsin State Representative

References

External links
U.S. Gazetteer's Arkansaw page
Wisconsin Historical Society, Articles about Arkansaw, Wisconsin

Census-designated places in Pepin County, Wisconsin
Census-designated places in Wisconsin